The Hassan II Dam, also known as the Sidi Said Dam, is a gravity dam on the Moulouya River about  north of Midelt in Midelt Province, Morocco. It has a maximum storage capacity of 400 million cubic meters. The dam is used for potable water, irrigation and the protection of downstream areas and dams against floods and siltation. Construction of the dam began in February 2001 and it was completed in March 2005.

References

Dams in Morocco
Gravity dams
Dams completed in 2005
Roller-compacted concrete dams
21st-century architecture in Morocco